The 2011 Women's EuroHockey Nations Championship was the 10th edition of the women's field hockey championship organised by the European Hockey Federation. It was held from 20 August to 27 August 2011 in Mönchengladbach, Germany.

This tournament was also a qualifier for the 2012 Olympics, with both finalists earning a spot. In the event that England played in the final, the third placed team would have qualified instead, as England cannot qualify as a nation for the olympics (being part of Great Britain).

The Netherlands won the title for the eighth time after defeating Germany 3–0 in the final.

Results
All times are Central European Summer Time (UTC+2)

Pool A

Pool B

Fifth to eighth place classification
The third and fourth place team in each pool competed in a pool to determine the fifth to eighth-place winners. The last two placers will be relegated to EuroHockey Nations Trophy in 2013. Note that the match played against each other in pool A or B counts in the pool C classification.

Pool C

First to fourth place classification

Semifinals

Third and fourth place

Final

Statistics

Final standings

Goalscorers

References

External links
Official website

 
Women's EuroHockey Nations Championship
EuroHockey Championship
EuroHockey Championship
International women's field hockey competitions hosted by Germany
Sport in Mönchengladbach
EuroHockey Championship
Women 1
EuroHockey Nations Championship
Field hockey at the Summer Olympics – Women's European qualification
21st century in Mönchengladbach